Oy W. Rosenlew Ab is a defunct Finnish multi-industrial company that operated between 1853 and 1987. It was one of the largest industrial companies in Finland. The production facilities were located mainly in Pori.

Electrolux owns the brand of home appliances and uses it in Finland. Electrolux stopped the manufacturing of fridges in Pori, Finland, in 1998.

References

External links 
Rosenlew Homepage - Official site of the Rosenlew home appliances
Sampo-Rosenlew Oy - Official English site of Sampo-Rosenlew Oy

Electrolux brands
Defunct manufacturing companies of Finland
Electronics companies of Finland
Finnish brands
Manufacturing companies established in 1853
Manufacturing companies disestablished in 1987
Pori
Pulp and paper companies of Finland
Companies formerly listed on Nasdaq Helsinki